Mahdia is a Tunisian coastal city with 62,189 inhabitants, south of Monastir and southeast of Sousse.

Mahdia is a provincial centre north of Sfax. It is important for the associated fish-processing industry, as well as weaving. It is the capital of Mahdia Governorate.

History

Antiquity 
The old part of Mahdia corresponds to the Roman city called Aphrodisium and, later, called Africa (a name perhaps derived from the older name), or Cape Africa. The Catholic Church's list of titular sees includes a no longer residential bishopric called Africa and, since there is no record of an episcopal see in Roman times called by either of these names (nor by that of Alipota, another Roman town that Charles Tissot suggested tentatively might be represented by present-day Mehdia), it is supposed that the episcopal see of Africa was established when the city was held by the Kingdom of Sicily, as a part of the Kingdom of Africa (1147–1160) and when Pope Eugene III consecrated a bishop for it in 1148. An inventory of movable property of the church of Africa (inventarium thesauri Africani) exists in an archive of the Cappella Palatina of Palermo in Sicily. Robert Favreau identified Mahdia instead with ancient Ruspae or Ruspe, which is more commonly taken to have been at Henchir Sbia (or just Sbia), north of Mahdia, or at the ruins known as Ksour Siad. The most illustrious bishop of this see was Fulgentius of Ruspe. The Catholic Church's list of titular sees, which identifies the see of Africa as Mahdia, identifies Ruspe/Ruspae as Henchir Sbia.

The Mahdia shipwreck – a sunken ship found off Mahdia's shore, containing Greek art treasures – is dated to about 80 BC, the early part of Roman rule in this region.

Islamic era 
Muslim Mahdia was founded by the Fatimids under the Caliph Abdallah al-Mahdi and made the capital of Ifriqiya. As the then-newly-created Fatimid Caliphate was a Shi'a regime supported by a Berber Kutama military, the caliph may have been motivated to move his capital here so as to put some distance between his power base and the predominantly Sunni city of Kairouan (the traditional capital of Ifriqiya up to that point). Construction began in 916 and the new city was officially inaugurated on 20 February 921, although some construction continued afterward. In addition to its heavy fortified walls, the city included the Fatimid palaces, an artificial harbor, and a congregational mosque (the Great Mosque of Mahdia). Most of the Fatimid city has not survived to the present day. The mosque, however, is one of the most well-preserved Fatimid monuments in the Maghreb, although it has been extensively damaged over time and was in large part reconstructed by archeologists in the 1960s. Fragments of mosaic pavements from the palaces have also been discovered from modern excavations. 

In 1087, the town was attacked by raiding ships from Genoa and Pisa who burned the Muslim fleet in the harbor. The attack played a critical role in Christians' seizure of control of the Western Mediterranean, which allowed the First Crusade to be supplied by sea. The Zirid dynasty, which succeeded the Fatimids in the Maghreb, moved their capital here in 1057. Their rule was brought to an end by the Norman conquest of the city in 1148. In 1160 the city came under Almohad rule.

The role of the capital was taken over by Tunis in the 12th century during the Almohad era, which it remained during the Hafsid Dynasty. Later the city was subject to many raids. In 1390 it was the target of the Barbary Crusade, when a French army laid siege to the city but failed to take it.

The city was captured by the Spaniards in 1550. A Spanish garrison remained there until 1553. Charles V then offered the charge of the town to the Order of Saint John who ruled Malta but they refused it deeming it too expensive. The emperor ordered the Viceroy of Sicily, Juan de Vega, to dismantle Mahdia despite it being a strategically important stronghold. The demolition tasks were carried out by Hernando de Acuña. Shortly after Mahdia was reoccupied by the Ottomans, but only to live by fishing and oil-works, and the town lost its logistic and commercial importance. It remained under Turkish rule until the 19th century.

During the Nazi Occupation of Tunisia in World War II, Mahdia was the site where Khaled Abdelwahhab hid approximately two dozen persecuted Jews.

Transport 
Gare Mahdia forms the southern terminus of the metre-gauge Sahel Metro railway line, which runs from Sousse and Monastir.

Climate

Gallery of images

See also 
 European enclaves in North Africa before 1830
 Mahdia shipwreck
 List of cities in Tunisia

References

Notes

External links 

 tourismtunisia.com 
 LookLex / Tunisia
 Mahdia Portal
 

 
921 establishments
Populated places established in the 10th century
Cities in Tunisia
Mediterranean port cities and towns in Tunisia
Communes of Tunisia
Populated places in Mahdia Governorate
10th-century establishments in Ifriqiya
Fatimid cities
10th-century establishments in the Fatimid Caliphate
Fatimid architecture in Tunisia